Diego Gutiérrez was a Spanish cosmographer and cartographer of the Casa de la Contratación.  He was given this post by royal appointment on 22 October 1554, after the death of his father Dylanger in January 1554, and worked on the Padrón Real, the Spanish master map.

New World map

In 1562 Gutiérrez published a remarkable map entitled Americae Sive Quartae Orbis Partis Nova Et Exactissima Descriptio in Antwerp (then part of the Spanish Netherlands) in collaboration with the printer Hieronymus Cock. The reason it was published in Antwerp was because the Spanish engravers were not skilled enough to print such a complicated document.

Gutiérrez's map features not only the Amazon River system and Lake Titicaca as well as other geographical features, but also fanciful depictions of parrots, monkeys, mermaids, huge sea creatures, Brazilian cannibals, Patagonian giants, and an erupting volcano in central Mexico.

It was the first map to print the toponym "California". It also recorded the first appearance of a word for "Appalachia," as the term "Apalchen."

References

External links
Gutiérrez, the Americas, 1562  Copy in the British Library. Deep zoom feature, highlighted details. Video introduction from Curator of Antiquarian Mapping
The 1562 Map of America by Diego Gutiérrez
 David Walls, "On the Naming of Appalachia." 

Spanish cartographers
Year of birth missing
Year of death missing
16th-century cartographers
16th-century Spanish people